Louhans is a commune in the Saône-et-Loire department in the region of Bourgogne-Franche-Comté in eastern France. Louhans is the capital of Bresse bourguignonne and a subprefecture of the department.

Geography
Louhans is centrally located on the plain of Bresse, a strongly agricultural region in the eastern part of the department of Saône-et-Loire.  The Vallière forms part of the commune's southeastern border, then flows into the Solnan, which forms part of the commune's southern border. The Solnan flows into the Seille in the town. The Seille flows south-southwest through the western part of the commune and crosses the town.

Population
The population data given in the table below for 1968 and refer to the commune of Louhans in its geography at the given dates. In 1973 Louhans absorbed the former communes of Châteaurenaud, Branges and Sornay. In 1979 Branges and Sornay were re-established as independent communes.

Gallery

See also
 CS Louhans-Cuiseaux
Communes of the Saône-et-Loire department

References

External links
 Louhans GRS Club (Rhythmic Gymnastics)

Communes of Saône-et-Loire
Subprefectures in France
Burgundy